The Poor Knights Islands (Māori: Tawhiti Rahi) are a group of islands off the east coast of the Northland Region of the North Island of New Zealand. Uninhabited since the 1820s, they are a nature reserve and popular underwater diving spot, with boat tours typically departing from Tutukaka. The Poor Knights Islands Marine Reserve surrounds the island.  

Beaglehole (1955) comments that the origin of the island name is not clear, and speculates that the name could be related to the Poor Knights of Windsor, or that the islands were named for their resemblance to Poor Knight's Pudding, a bread-based dish topped with egg and fried, popular at the time of discovery by Europeans.

Description
Aorangaia and Archway Island lie to the southwest of Aorangi Island, and there is also a group of smaller rocky islets between the two main islands, the largest of which is Motu Kapiti.

Oceanography
The deep water around the island results in only moderate tidal currents. These are around the same magnitude as the prevailing shelf currents.

A remarkable feature of the region is the large internal tides that occur. These are a form of internal wave driven by the local tidal flow forcing the stratification against sloping areas of the shelf face. The surface manifestation of these waves can be seen from space. These waves generate brief highly localised accelerations.

Geology

The Poor Knights Islands were created in some of the earliest eruptions of the Coromandel Volcanic Zone, between 10 and 9.5 million years ago. The Poor Knights Islands vulcanism represents an early period for the Coromandel Volcanic Zone, as changes in tectonic forces caused the east belt of the Northland Arc (23 to 16 million years ago) to begin moving southwards, and eventually forming the modern Taupō Volcanic Zone.

Environment
The islands are protected as a nature reserve and a permit is required to land or tie boats up. Permits are usually granted only for scientific research. A notable native plant of the islands is the spectacularly flowering Poor Knights lily, which has become a popular garden plant.

Feral pigs, which had roamed Aorangi since the departure of Māori in the 1820s, were exterminated in 1936. The islands have been identified as an Important Bird Area, by BirdLife International because they are home to a breeding population of about 200,000 pairs of Buller's shearwaters.

Tawhiti Rahi contains the Northern Arch, Middle Arch, and Maomao Arch, the latter being a popular diving location.

History
The islands were earlier inhabited by Māori of the Ngāti Wai tribe who grew crops and fished the surrounding sea. The tribe traded with other Maori.

A chief of the tribe named Tatua led his warriors on a fighting expedition to the Hauraki Gulf with Ngā Puhi chief Hongi Hika in the early 1820s. While they were away, a slave named Paha escaped the islands and travelled to Hokianga where he told Waikato, a chief of the Hikutu tribe, that the islands had been left undefended. As Waikato had been offended by Tatua some years previous when he was refused pigs he had come to trade for, so he and his warriors set out on three large canoes to attack the islands. They arrived at the islands one night in December 1823 and soon overpowered the islanders in the absence of their warriors. Many islanders jumped off the high cliffs to avoid being taken as slaves. Tatua's wife Oneho and daughter were captured and taken to the mainland where a distant relative recognised the wife and helped the two to escape.

Tatua returned to the islands to find a scene of destruction. Only nine or ten people were left on the islands, including his five-year-old son Wehiwehi who had been hidden in a cave during the attack. The islands were declared tapu and Tatua left with the survivors and went to Rawhiti in the Bay of Islands where he unexpectedly found his wife and daughter.

See also

 List of volcanoes in New Zealand
 List of islands of New Zealand
 List of islands
 Desert island

References

External links 

"Geology – New Zealand's Geological History", from An Encyclopaedia of New Zealand, edited by A. H. McLintock, originally published in 1966. Te Ara - The Encyclopedia of New Zealand, updated 2006-09-26. Retrieved 2007-04-15.

Uninhabited islands of New Zealand
Whangarei District
Underwater diving sites in New Zealand
Pliocene volcanoes
Extinct volcanoes
Former populated places in New Zealand
Important Bird Areas of New Zealand
Islands of the Northland Region
Volcanoes of the Northland Region
Volcanic islands of New Zealand